Lydia Kwa (born 1959 in Singapore) is a Canadian writer and psychologist.

First coming to Canada in 1980, Kwa studied psychology at the University of Toronto and Queen's University. She published one short story and a volume of poetry in the 1990s, but has concentrated primarily on novels since. In addition to her writing, she continues to practice as a clinical therapist in Vancouver, British Columbia. She was a nominee for the Amazon.ca First Novel Award in 2000, the ReLit Award in 2001 and the Lambda Literary Award for Lesbian Fiction in 2002 for This Place Called Absence, and for the Ethel Wilson Fiction Prize in 2006 for The Walking Boy.

She is an out lesbian.

Works
The Colour of Heroines (1994, poetry)
This Place Called Absence (2000, novel)
The Walking Boy (2005, novel)
Pulse (2010, novel)
Sinuous (2013, poetry)
"The Right Hand" (2017, short story)
Oracle Bone (2017, novel)
The Walking Boy (2019, novel)--a rewrite of the 2005 novel, now a sequel to Oracle Bone

References

External links
Lydia Kwa

1959 births
Canadian women novelists
Canadian women poets
Canadian psychologists
Canadian writers of Asian descent
Canadian lesbian writers
Singaporean LGBT writers
Singaporean emigrants to Canada
Queen's University at Kingston alumni
University of Toronto alumni
Writers from Vancouver
Living people
Canadian LGBT poets
20th-century Canadian poets
21st-century Canadian poets
21st-century Canadian novelists
Canadian LGBT novelists
20th-century Canadian women writers
21st-century Canadian women writers
Lesbian novelists
21st-century Canadian LGBT people
20th-century Canadian LGBT people